Kristína Tormová (born 1 July 1982) is a Slovak actress, singer, dramaturge, presenter, comedian, editor, blogger and naïve art painter.

She studied dramaturgy at Academy of Performing Arts in Bratislava and at Faculty of Theater in Prague, Czech Republic. Since 2004, she is a regular member of the Naive Theater Radošina in Bratislava, while made guest appearances for The Drama Club in Prague. For her role of Klára in Pouta (2010), she received a Czech Lion-nomination as the Best Actress in Leading Role in 2011. From 2008, she hosts a television program called Postav dom, zasaď strom, and most currently also the music show Pop Legends, both produced by RTVS.

Filmography

Cinema

Notes
A  Denotes a short film.

Television

Notes
B  Denotes a TV series.
C  Denotes a televised theater.

Awards 

Notes
D  While the winner became Zuzana Bydžovská for her role of Irena in Mamas & Papas by Alice Nellis, the other nominees featured Lenka Vlasáková (Ženy v pokušení by Jiří Vejdělek), Anna Geislerová (Občanský průkaz by Ondřej Trojan) and Simona Babčáková (Největší z Čechů by Robert Sedláček).

References

General
 

Specific

External links 
 
 Kristína Farkašová gallery by Google Images

Living people
1982 births
21st-century Slovak actresses
Dramaturges
Actors from Bratislava